Alexis Márquez may refer to:
 Alexis Márquez (swimmer)
 Alexis Márquez (footballer)